Juan José Aramburu Amorena (born 13 October 1981 in Irun) is an Olympic skeet shooter. At the 2008 Summer Olympics he finished eighth in his event so did not advance to the final. Later he won a gold medal at the 2011 Skeet shooting World Championships in Belgrade.  At the 2012 Summer Olympics, Aramburu again competed in the men's skeet but did not advance to the final.

Records

Notes

References

External links 
 
 
 
 
 
 

1981 births
Living people
Spanish male sport shooters
Skeet shooters
Olympic shooters of Spain
Shooters at the 2008 Summer Olympics
Shooters at the 2012 Summer Olympics
European Games competitors for Spain
Shooters at the 2015 European Games
Shooters at the 2019 European Games
Sportspeople from Irun
21st-century Spanish people